Satwant Singh is a Zambian rally driver, and 8-time winner of the African Rally Championship.

A successful businessman and entrepreneur, Singh is a well established and much decorated figure in motor sport, especially in Central and Southern Africa.

Born on 3 March 1943 he is the youngest of his siblings. Eldest sister Gurdeep and followed brother Guru Singh.

Family:
Lee-Anne Singh nee Piers met Satwant in 1974 in Lusaka through her brother, Adrian Piers, who served for Satwant in 1973 for the East African Safari Rally when he finished seventh, the highest-placed private entry.
Their romance was fraught with many battles on several levels cultural, societal, age and family. Despite all odds they did get married have two daughters Prethi and Mandeep, and 2 grandchildren.

Rallying is in the Singh's blood and very prevalent even today with his nephews and nieces and a generation further!

Satwant's siblings:
Gurdeep has two children Raju and Pappu Saran who also rallied.
Guru Singh has three children Rammy, Tinky and Muna Singh all with notable careers in Rallying.

Past achievements
 8 times FIA African Continent Rally Champion - 1988, 1989, 1991, 1993, 1996, 1997, 1998, 2000
 Awarded the “Order of Distinguished Services” (ODS) by the Head of State (Zambia) for outstanding sporting performance.
 Awarded the “Outstanding Contribution to Sport” by the National Sports Council of Zambia
 Zambian National Rally Champion - 1972, 1975, 1986, 1987, 1988, 1989, 1991, 1992, 1995, 1998
 Rothmans of Pall Mall Sportsman of the Year - 1972, 1987, 1988, 1989, 1993, 1997
 Rothmans of Pall Mall International Sportsman of the Year - 1996
 Orbitsports Man of the Month - April & October 1976

International attainments
East African Safari Rally	
 1976	13th overall	Datsun 180B	Dave Haworth - Highest placed private entry, Class winner
 1973	7th overall	Colt Galant 	John Mitchell - Outstanding Performance Award
 1972			   Datsun 1200 - Meritorious Performance Award

Zimbabwe Challenge
 1998
 1997
 1996	3rd overall	Subaru Impreza	S. Thatthi	
 1995	2nd overall	Hyundai Accent	Jim Redmond
 1993	2nd overall	Toyota Celica	Supee Soin
 1991	2nd overall	Mitsubishi VR4	Mike Doughty
 1990	1st overall	VW Golf GTi 	S. Thatthi
 1989	2nd overall	VW Golf GTi	S. Thatthi
 1988	1st overall	Opel Manta	S. Thatthi
 1987	1st overall	Opel Manta	S. Thatthi
 1985	1st overall	Opel Manta	Supee Soin
 1984	5th overall	Fiat 131	Jim Pilling

Zambia Int Rally	
 2000	1st overall	Subaru Impreza	S. Thatthi
 1998	1st overall	
 1997	1st overall	Subaru Impreza	S.Thatthi
 1996	1st overall	Hyundai Elantra	Jim Redmond
 1995	1st overall	Hyundai Accent	E. Gangat
 1994	1st overall	VW Golf GTi	L.A. Singh
 1993	2nd overall	Toyota Celica	E. Gangat
 1992 	2nd overall	VW Golf GTi	M. Verjee
 1991	1st overall	VW Golf GTi	S. Thatthi
 1989	1st overall	VW Golf GTi	S. Thatthi
 1988	2nd overall	Opel Manta	L.A. Singh
 1987	2nd overall	Opel Manta 	Thee Soin
 1986	1st overall	Opel Manta	Chris Jennings
 1985	1st overall	Opel Manta	Guy Hall
 1975	1st overall	Datsun 1600SSS	Dave Haworth
 1974	1st overall	Datsun 1600SSS	John Mitchell
 1970	2nd overall	Datsun 1600SSS	John Mitchell
 1969	3rd overall	Peugeot 404	John Mitchell

Castrol Rally SA	
 2000
 1998
 1997	10th overall	Subaru Impreza	S. Thatthi
 1996	12th overall	Hyundai Elantra	S. Thatthi
 1994	3rd overall	Toyota Celica	Richard Leeke
 1993	4th overall	Toyota Celica	Richard Leeke
				
PMC Rally SA
 1997	12th overall	Subaru Impreza	S. Thatthi
 1996	12th overall	Subaru Impreza	S. Thatthi
 
Safari du Zaïre
 1991	2nd overall	VW Golf GTi	S. Voukovich
 1987	Best Sportsman Award Opel Manta	Guy Hall
 1986	Meritorious Award Opel Manta	Guy Hall

Rallye du Burundi
 1997	1st overall	Subaru Impreza	S.Thatthi
 1993	1st overall	Toyota Celica	Luc Verhulst
 1991	1st overall	Mitsubishi VR4	L.Verhulst
 1990	1st overall	VW Golf GTi	Luc Verhulst
 1989	1st overall	VW Golf GTi	Luc Verhulst
 1988	1st overall	VW Golf GTi	Luc Verhulst

Rallye du Rwanda
 2000	2nd overall	Subaru Imprezza	M. Goma
 1989	1st overall	VW Golf GTi	Luc Verhulst
 1988	2nd overall	VW Golf GTi	Luc Verhulst

Total Tara Namibia
 2000	2nd overall	Subaru Impreza	M. Goma
 1998
 1997	10th overall	Subaru Impreza	S.Thatthi
 1994	4th overall	VW Golf GTi	K. Pretorious
 1991	2nd overall	VW Golf GTi 	S. Thatthi

Equator Rally Kenya
 2000 	6th overall	Subaru Impreza	M.Verjee
 1998	3rd overall
 1997	6th overall	Subaru Impreza	S. Thatthi
 1996	1st overall	Subaru Impreza	S. Thatthi
 1993	3rd overall	Toyota Celica	S. Thatthi
 1991	3rd overall	Mitsubishi VR4	S. Thatthi

Tanzania Thousand
 1973	2nd overall	Datsun 1600SSS	John Mitchell 
 1972	3rd overall	Datsun 1600SSS	John Mitchell 
 1971	6th overall	Datsun 1200	John Mitchell 
 1969	2nd overall	Peugeot 404	Guru Singh

Pearl of Africa Rally
Uganda			
2nd overall	Subaru Impreza	M.Goma

References

5. https://zambezimagic.dstv.com/news/my-story-premieres-with-satwant-singh
6.https://www.motorsportmagazine.com/archive/article/december-1994/63/rally-review-zambia-rally

Zambian rally drivers
Living people
Year of birth missing (living people)
Zambian people of Indian descent